Andor Margitics (born 3 January 1991) is a Hungarian professional footballer who plays for Budafoki MTE.

Club statistics

Updated to games played as of 15 May 2021.

References
MLSZ 
HLSZ 

1991 births
Living people
Footballers from Budapest
Hungarian footballers
Association football defenders
Vác FC players
Fehérvár FC players
Budafoki LC footballers
Puskás Akadémia FC players
Nemzeti Bajnokság I players
Nemzeti Bajnokság II players